11949 Kagayayutaka, provisional designation , is a stony background asteroid from the outer region of the asteroid belt, approximately  in diameter. It was discovered on 19 September 1993, by Japanese amateur astronomers Kin Endate and Kazuro Watanabe at Kitami Observatory in eastern Hokkaidō, Japan. The asteroid was named after Japanese artist Kagaya Yutaka.

Orbit and classification 

Kagayayutaka is a non-family asteroid from the main belt's background population. It orbits the Sun in the outer main-belt at a distance of 2.5–3.6 AU once every 5 years and 5 months (1,984 days). Its orbit has an eccentricity of 0.18 and an inclination of 8° with respect to the ecliptic. The body's observation arc starts with its official discovery observation.

Naming 

This minor planet was named after Kagaya Yutaka (born 1968), a Japanese space and digital artist and receiver of the Gold Medal in the American Digital Art Contest in 2000. The approved naming citation was published by the Minor Planet Center on 10 September 2003.

Physical characteristics 

Kagayayutaka has been characterized as a stony S-type asteroid by Pan-STARRS photometric survey.

Diameter and albedo 

According to the survey carried out by NASA's Wide-field Infrared Survey Explorer with its subsequent NEOWISE mission, Kagayayutaka measures 22.28 kilometers in diameter and its surface has a high albedo of 0.708, while the Collaborative Asteroid Lightcurve Link assumes a standard albedo for carbonaceous asteroids of 0.057 and calculates a diameter of 23.21 kilometers with an absolute magnitude of 11.9.

Lightcurves 

A rotational lightcurve of Kagayayutaka was obtained from photometric observations by French astronomer René Roy in November 2015. Lightcurve analysis gave a rotation period of  hours with a brightness variation of 0.28 magnitude.

References

External links 
 Asteroid Lightcurve Database (LCDB), query form (info )
 Dictionary of Minor Planet Names, Google books
 Asteroids and comets rotation curves, CdR – Observatoire de Genève, Raoul Behrend
 Discovery Circumstances: Numbered Minor Planets (10001)-(15000) – Minor Planet Center
 
 

011949
Discoveries by Kazuro Watanabe
Discoveries by Kin Endate
Named minor planets
19930919